Chu Guangxi (706/707–760) was a Tang Dynasty poet.

Biography 
Chu Guangxi was born in around 706 or 707, and was originally from Yan Province (modern-day Shandong Province).

In the last year of the Tianbao era he was appointed investigating censor. He was implicated in the An Lushan Rebellion and exiled to Lingnan.

Poetry 
His surviving poems, such as "Mutong Ci" ( mù tóng cí) and "Diaoyu Wan" ( diào yú wān), are simple, elegant and pastoral.

Notes

References

Works cited

External links 
Books of the Quan Tangshi that include collected poems of Chu Guangxi at the Chinese Text Project:
Book 136
Book 137
Book 138
Book 139

Tang dynasty poets
8th-century Chinese poets
707 births
760 deaths
Writers from Changzhou
Poets from Jiangsu
People from Jintan District